Coreana is a gossamer-winged butterfly genus.

It may also refer to:

 Coreana (company), a South Korean company, linked to the Coreana Cosmetic Museum in Seoul
 "Corana", a Geographic Beanie Baby toy

See also

 Ulmus parvifolia var. coreana, the Korean elm